Badr Airlines, formerly Sarit Airlines (from 1997 to 2004), is an airline based in Khartoum, Sudan, operating cargo and passenger air services for humanitarian aid missions and chartered VIP flights. Its main base is Khartoum International Airport.

Destinations
As of February 2023, Badr Airlines operates to the following destinations:

Fleet
The Badr Airlines fleet includes:

References

External links

ALS

Airlines of Sudan
Airlines established in 1997
Cargo airlines of Sudan
Companies based in Khartoum